The 1991 FIA Formula One World Championship was the 45th season of FIA Formula One motor racing and the 42nd season of the Formula One World Championship. It featured the 1991 Formula One World Championship for Drivers and the 1991 Formula One World Championship for Constructors, which were contested concurrently over a sixteen-race series that commenced on 10 March and ended on 3 November. Ayrton Senna won his third and last Drivers' Championship, and McLaren-Honda won their fourth consecutive Constructors' Championship. Senna won seven of the sixteen races; his main challenger for the title was Nigel Mansell, who won five races in his first season back at Williams. Senna's fierce rival Alain Prost failed to win a race with Ferrari and was fired before the end of the season due to a dispute with the team. 1991 also saw the debuts of future world champions Michael Schumacher and Mika Häkkinen, as well as the retirement of three-time champion Nelson Piquet.

, this is the last World Championship season to be won by a Brazilian racing driver, a V12-engined car, or a car equipped with a manual gearbox. , it is also the last constructors' title won by a Honda-powered car (although the supplier Red Bull Powertrains who won the constructors' championship in 2022 used a Honda-based engine design and had Honda technical assistance), and it was the last drivers' championship to be won by a Honda-powered driver until Max Verstappen's Championship win in 2021.

Also, this was Pirelli's last season as the tyre supplier for the Formula One World Championship, until they returned the sport again in 2011, where they become the sole tyre supplier for the sport in that season.

Drivers and constructors
The following teams and drivers competed in the 1991 FIA Formula One World Championship.

Calendar

Calendar changes
 The French Grand Prix was moved from Circuit Paul Ricard to Circuit de Nevers Magny-Cours.

 The Spanish Grand Prix was moved from Circuito de Jerez to Circuit de Barcelona-Catalunya.

Pre-season

 McLaren retained their successful 1990 lineup of Senna and Gerhard Berger.
 Williams re-signed their former driver Nigel Mansell on the promise that he would be the top driver in the team after several years as number two to Nelson Piquet at Williams and then Alain Prost at Ferrari. He was partnered by Riccardo Patrese, retained from 1990.
 Ferrari kept Alain Prost as lead driver and replaced the departed Mansell with Jean Alesi, a young driver who had impressed at Tyrrell.
 Benetton began the season with two experienced Brazilian drivers: Roberto Moreno and triple world champion Nelson Piquet. During the season, Moreno was controversially replaced by German rookie Michael Schumacher.
 Former greats Lotus had had a torrid 1990 with a severe career-ending accident for Martin Donnelly (plus losing the experienced Derek Warwick who went back to sports car racing), loss of title sponsorship from Camel and a management buyout. Originally, the team had appointed Donnelly as 'number one driver' (partnering Häkkinen and Bailey) as Martin was hoped to come back racing by April 1991, though his 1990 crash at Jerez effectively ended his racing career. Lotus also went back to using Judd V8 power in 1991 after a dismal 1990 using the fast but fragile Lamborghini V12 engine.

Three teams that started the 1990 season would not make the start of the 1991 season: EuroBrun had failed to complete the season. Onyx Grand Prix also pulled out during 1990, but went as far as designing a 1991 car before finally folding, while the absence of Life, a team that failed to prequalify for every race, surprised no-one.

The Osella team was now Fondmetal, though driver Olivier Grouillard was retained along with the 1989 Osella car and most of the staff.

The Arrows team was renamed Footwork after an investment by Japanese businessman Wataru Ohashi, President of Footwork Express Co., Ltd.

There were two entirely new entrants for the 1991 season;
 Jordan Grand Prix, a successful team in International Formula 3000. Their drivers were Bertrand Gachot and Andrea de Cesaris, though Gachot serving two months intrusion for assaulting a London cab driver partway through the season would mean that Michael Schumacher, Alessandro Zanardi and Roberto Moreno also drove the car.
 The other new team was the Modena Team. It originally began life in late 1990 as GLAS with Mexican investment. Former Arrows, Alfa Romeo and Spirit driver, Mauro Baldi, was one of  the proposed drivers and they had brokered a deal with Lamborghini that would see the Italian marque, operating under Lamborghini Engineering, design and build a chassis for the team as well as supply their V12 engines. But, the Mexican investors pulled out before the season even began. Lamborghini stepped in and provided financial assistance to save the team and relocated the team to Modena, Italy and initiated the subsequent name-change. The team signed up drivers Nicola Larini and Eric van de Poele. Although the team was a de facto factory effort by Lamborghini, Lamborghini entered the team under a separate name to avoid being associated with a struggling team. But this did not stop journalists and fans alike from referring to the team as Lambo though. 1991 would be a very difficult year for the team, as aside from the drivers regularly failing to qualify their cars, finances quickly become an issue after Lamborghini's once off investment in the team had dried up. 1991 would in fact turn out to be the team's only season in the sport.

At the start of the season, pre-qualifying was needed for five teams: both cars of the Jordan, Dallara and Modena teams and the single entrants of the Fondmetal and Coloni teams.

A change to the points system in 1991 saw the winning driver now awarded 10 points instead of 9 as previously. More significantly, points from all races would now count towards the championship, instead of only each driver's best eleven results as previously.

Race-by-race

Race 1: USA

The season started off at the Phoenix street circuit that had a modified layout to make it more of a challenge to drivers. Senna took pole ahead of Prost, Patrese, Mansell, Piquet and Alesi. At the start, Senna and Prost maintained their places while Mansell sliced ahead of Patrese and Piquet lost out to Alesi and Berger. The order at the end of lap 1 was: Senna, Prost, Mansell, Patrese, Alesi and Berger.

Early on, as Senna was pulling away from Prost, Alesi got past Patrese for fourth. However, Patrese repassed him on lap 16 and closed up on Mansell. He attacked on lap 22 but shot into an escape road and rejoined behind Alesi and Berger. He quickly closed up on them with Berger attacking Alesi but unable to pass. Patrese passed Berger on lap 34. On the next lap, Mansell's gearbox failed and soon afterward, on lap 36, Berger had fuel pump trouble, which forced him to retire. Patrese then passed Alesi who pitted on lap 43. He closed in on Prost and the Ferrari pitted on lap 46, with right rear troubles putting him down to seventh.

Patrese didn't last much longer, his gearbox failing and then the stationary car was hit by Roberto Moreno, forcing both of them out. Piquet, who did not stop, was passed by Alesi for second with Prost taking fourth off Stefano Modena soon after. Alesi was having gearbox troubles and was holding back Piquet as Prost began to attack both of them. On lap 70, Piquet passed Alesi and Prost followed him through. Prost then shifted sides getting ahead of Piquet as well. Modena passed Alesi for fourth and Alesi soon retired with gearbox troubles. Unflustered by all this, Senna won from Prost, Piquet, Modena, Satoru Nakajima and Aguri Suzuki. This would be the last Formula One Grand Prix on the streets of downtown Phoenix, Arizona and the last Formula One race in the United States for 9 years; Formula One would return to a very different part of the United States in 2000 – the historic Indianapolis Motor Speedway, that had a whole new road course built within the facility just for the Grand Prix.

Race 2: Brazil

The field traveled to Brazil and Senna pleased his fans at the Interlagos circuit in his home city of São Paulo by taking pole at his home track ahead of the two Williams cars of Patrese and Mansell who were in front of Berger, Alesi and Prost. At the start, Senna took off and Mansell got by Patrese while Alesi got by Berger and Piquet got ahead of Prost. The order was: Senna, Mansell, Patrese, Alesi, Berger and Piquet.

Mansell began to attack Senna but could not pass. Senna then slowly pulled away from Mansell who had a slow pit stop on lap 22. He stayed second after the stops but 7 seconds behind Senna, the major change as a result of the stops was that Piquet who did not stop was third and that Berger and Prost had got by Alesi.

Berger blasted past Piquet soon afterward as Mansell began to catch Senna. Mansell was closing in but had to stop on lap 50 with a puncture. He charged back towards Senna who was experiencing gearbox troubles. However, it was Mansell's gearbox which ironically gave way on lap 60. Patrese was having the same problem but still running in second and Berger was having trouble with a sticking throttle. It began to rain and Prost passed Piquet for fourth. The top three struggled with the wet conditions; especially Senna, who had gearbox trouble and only had 6th gear. Senna won followed by Patrese, Berger, Prost, Piquet and Alesi.

Race 3: San Marino

At Imola, Senna took his 55th pole position ahead of Patrese, Prost, Mansell, Berger and Modena. It rained as they were approaching the start and Prost spun off on the parade lap and was out. At the start, Patrese got ahead of Senna while Mansell had gearbox problems and retired after being hit by Martin Brundle's Brabham. The order was: Patrese, Senna, Berger, Modena, Alesi and Nakajima.

Patrese pulled away but pitted on lap 10 with a misfire and rejoined several laps down. On lap 16, Nakajima retired from fourth with transmission failure. After the stops, Senna stayed ahead of Berger while Moreno got fourth from Pierluigi Martini. Soon afterward JJ Lehto passed Martini to take fifth. At the front, the gap between Senna and Berger was stable. Modena retired on lap 42 with transmission troubles, promoting Moreno to third which he held only for eight laps when Lehto passed him. On lap 52, Moreno retired with an engine failure. On the last lap, Eric van de Poele was set for a 5th-place finish but retired with a fuel pump problem. At the front, Senna won ahead of Berger, Lehto, Martini, Mika Häkkinen and Julian Bailey.

Race 4: Monaco

Senna took another pole in Monaco with Modena a surprising second ahead of Patrese, Piquet, Mansell and Berger. At the start, Berger hit Piquet and Piquet was out while Berger dropped to the back. The order was: Senna, Modena, Patrese, Mansell, Prost and Moreno.

With overtaking hard on the Monaco streets, there were no changes until Prost got past Mansell on lap 30. By now, Senna was over 10 seconds ahead of Modena, who was holding up Patrese. Soon afterward, Alesi passed Moreno for fourth and pulled away. Meanwhile, Nakajima in the other Tyrrell further down had spun off the track after making contact with Martini's Minardi on lap 35. On lap 43, Modena's engine blew in the tunnel and this blocked Patrese, who spun off into the wall and both were out, as ironically Alboreto well down in the Footwork had also retired with a blown Porsche engine in the Footwork leaving additional oil on the track at the Nouvelle chicane which later left Blundell's Brabham to spin off into the wall out of 10th place behind the leaders by lap 44 just after overtaking Bernard before he crashed.

Mansell was putting pressure on Prost, who had trouble with a loose wheel, and made a daring move through the chicane on lap 63 to take second and then really started flying with fastest lap after fastest lap before Prost eventually set the fastest lap on lap 77 (14 laps after his pit-stop as he was a lap down in 5th place). Soon afterward, Prost was forced to stop to change the wheel and dropped down to fifth. Senna took his fourth win in four ahead of Mansell, Alesi, Moreno, Prost and Emanuele Pirro.

Race 5: Canada

At the Circuit Gilles Villeneuve in Montreal, the Williams cars were 1–2 in qualifying, Patrese on pole ahead of Mansell, Senna, Prost, Moreno and Berger. At the start, Mansell got ahead of Patrese while Berger slipped past Moreno. It was Mansell leading from Patrese, Senna, Prost, Berger and Moreno. On lap 5, Berger retired with battery troubles but Moreno could take fifth only for 5 more laps before he spun off into retirement.

Mansell and Patrese were pulling away from Senna while there was a battle for fourth between Prost, Alesi and Piquet. On lap 26, Senna retired with alternator troubles and two laps later Prost was out with a failed gearbox. Alesi was third but on lap 35, his engine expired. This put Mansell in front of Patrese, Piquet, Modena, Andrea de Cesaris and Ivan Capelli. Patrese had to pit with a puncture and rejoined behind Piquet. He then had gearbox troubles and was passed by Modena as Capelli spun off.

On the last lap, Mansell waved to the crowd, and then he let his car's revs drop too low and stalled the Renault engine. This left a delighted Piquet to take his last career win ahead of Modena, Patrese, de Cesaris, Bertrand Gachot and Mansell who was classified sixth.

Race 6: Mexico

The extremely bumpy Hermanos Rodriguez Autodrome in Mexico saw a number of incidents during practice, including Senna crashing at the very fast Peraltada while trying to take it a bit faster than usual and his car overturned when it hit the tire barrier. Senna had come to Mexico City with a head injury that he got while jetskiing in Brazil, and had been critical of the dusty circuit's condition all through the weekend. Williams took 1–2 in qualifying with Patrese ahead of Mansell, Senna, Alesi, Berger and Piquet. Patrese made a poor start and lost three places while Alesi dived ahead of Senna. The order was: Mansell, Alesi, Senna, Patrese, Berger and Piquet. There was action as Senna passed Alesi with Patrese following him through and then Modena getting by Piquet.

Berger's engine failed on lap 6 and soon afterwards Patrese passed Senna and set off after Mansell. Modena then began to drop back. Patrese passed Mansell and then both Senna and Alesi had a go at the Englishman with Alesi spinning and dropping back to seventh. Patrese then began to pull away from Mansell who was holding up Senna. Meanwhile, Alesi passed Moreno and then de Cesaris as Mansell pulled away from Senna. He closed the gap to Patrese to 1.2 seconds before Patrese increased his pace and made the gap stable.

Alesi's clutch failed on lap 43 and Piquet had wheel bearing troubles two laps later and thus Gachot was fifth. He held it until he spun off on lap 52. At the front, Patrese won with Mansell making it a Williams 1–2 ahead of Senna, de Cesaris, Moreno and Éric Bernard.

Race 7: France

The French Grand Prix had moved from the Paul Ricard circuit near Marseille in southern France to the new Magny-Cours circuit in central France. Patrese took another pole ahead of home hero Prost, Senna, Mansell, Berger and Alesi.  At the start, Patrese had problems selecting his gear, and when he did start his car, he was engulfed by the field. This blocked Senna allowing Mansell to get ahead of him. The order was: Prost, Mansell, Senna, Berger, Alesi and Piquet.

On lap 6, Berger retired with yet another engine failure. Two laps later, there was trouble as Piquet lost places as Gianni Morbidelli tried to pass him and hit Capelli, taking both out while Piquet lost time and places. At the front, Mansell attacked Prost and passed him on lap 22. At the stops, Mansell had a slow one and Prost was back in the lead. Senna was under pressure from Alesi but holding him at bay, over 15 seconds behind the leaders.

Meanwhile, Mansell again began to close in on Prost and as the two wound through traffic on lap 54, Mansell made a superb move on the outside of the Adelaide hairpin to lead and then slowly pulled away. Mansell won from Prost, Senna, Alesi, the recovering Patrese and de Cesaris.

Race 8: United Kingdom

The Silverstone circuit had been heavily modified; it was no longer the simplistic, ultra-fast circuit it had been since its inception; it was now more of a technical circuit, but it was still relatively fast. Mansell took pole position ahead of Senna, Patrese, Berger, Prost and Alesi. At the start, Senna took the lead from Mansell while Berger hit Patrese, spinning Patrese out while Berger dropped down the order, behind Prost, Alesi and Moreno. At the front, Mansell turned off the rev-limiter to accelerate past Senna into the Hangar straight. Thus Mansell led from Senna, Alesi, Prost, Moreno and Berger.

Soon Berger passed Moreno for fifth and this became fourth when Prost spun, dropping two places. Moreno then retired with gearbox troubles. At the front, the gap between Mansell and Senna was around 4–5 seconds with Alesi third, a long way back. However, when he was trying to lap Suzuki, he hit Suzuki, taking both out. After the stops, Mansell stayed 10 seconds ahead of Senna with Berger a long way back but 20 seconds ahead of Prost.

Senna decided to try with a light fuel load to attack Mansell. He closed the gap to 7 seconds but because of that, he ran out of fuel on the last lap, which gave Mansell the opportunity to pick up the stranded Brazilian on his victory lap and drive him back to pit lane. Therefore, Mansell won ahead of Berger, Prost, Senna (classified fourth for starting final lap), Piquet and Gachot.

At the halfway stage of the season, Senna led the Drivers' Championship with 51 points, with Mansell second with 33, Patrese third with 22, and Prost fourth with 21. In the Constructors' Championship, McLaren led with 67 points, Williams close in second with 55, Ferrari third with 29, and Benetton fourth with 23.

Race 9: Germany

At the halfway point of the season, pre-qualifying was re-arranged. Dallara, Jordan and 'Lambo' escaped, while AGS, Footwork and Brabham needed to pre-qualify for rest of the season.

The second half of the year started at the very fast forested Hockenheim circuit in Germany and Mansell continued where he left off, taking pole ahead of Senna, Berger, Patrese, Prost and Alesi. At the start, Mansell took off while Berger got by Senna and Patrese again had a poor start, dropping behind the Ferraris. At the end of the first lap, Mansell led from Berger, Senna, Prost, Alesi and Patrese.

Patrese quickly got ahead of Alesi as the order settled down. Alesi decided to go without a stop while the rest pitted. However, Berger had some trouble in the stops and dropped back to 10th. Thus, the order was Alesi leading Mansell, Senna, Prost, Patrese and de Cesaris. Mansell quickly passed Alesi to lead and then pulled away. Prost and Senna were battling for third and Prost went wide at a corner trying to pass Senna allowing Patrese to take fourth.

Patrese quickly passed Senna to leave him with a frustrated Prost. Prost tried to pass him on lap 38 but Senna did not give him enough room and Prost spun off and retired. Meanwhile, Patrese had closed right in on Alesi and passed him on lap 39. On the last lap, Senna ran out of fuel again. No one, however could touch Mansell who won, with Patrese making it a Williams 1–2 ahead of Alesi, the recovering Berger, de Cesaris and Gachot.

Race 10: Hungary

Senna took pole at the Hungaroring in Mogyoród, Hungary ahead of Patrese, Mansell, Prost, Berger and Alesi. At the start, Patrese got away better than Senna but Senna moved over to block him. Mansell was forced to defend third from Prost and kept the place. The order was: Senna, Patrese, Mansell, Prost, Berger and Alesi.

The top four stayed together and there was no way one could overtake the other on the twisting Hungaroring circuit. They pulled away from Berger who had a gap to Alesi. Prost's engine blew on lap 28, reducing the battle  at the front to three. The pit stops changed nothing but after them Mansell began to hound his teammate Patrese for second. Patrese let him get past to see what Mansell can do about Senna but he realised that the answer was nothing. Senna was continuing to slowly edge away. A dull race was won by Senna ahead of Mansell, Patrese, Berger, Alesi and Capelli.

Race 11: Belgium

Belgian driver Bertrand Gachot missed his home Grand Prix due to being imprisoned in Britain following an incident in which he sprayed tear gas at a London taxi driver. His Jordan seat was filled by then-unknown German driver Michael Schumacher.

At the popular and scenic Spa-Francorchamps circuit in Belgium, Senna took pole ahead of Patrese, Prost, Mansell, Berger, Alesi, Piquet and the new sensation, Schumacher. (After Saturday qualifying, Patrese's car was found to not comply with safety regulations and Patrese's Saturday times were wiped out, thus starting 17th). At the start, Senna defended from Prost while Piquet and Schumacher got past Alesi. However, Schumacher slowed with a clutch problem on the run down to Eau Rouge and retired. At the front, Senna led from Prost, Mansell, Berger, Piquet and Alesi. On lap 3, Prost had fuel leaking out of his car and retired.

Mansell began to attack Senna and after the stops got ahead of him. There was trouble when Berger spun after his stop and lost a lot of time. After the stops, Mansell led Alesi (who planned to go without stopping), Senna, Piquet, a recovering Patrese and de Cesaris. Then on lap 22, Mansell slowed to a halt with an electrical failure, giving Alesi the lead of the race. Senna's engine then stopped for some time and because of that Piquet, Patrese and de Cesaris were right with him and allowing Alesi to remain in the lead. Senna was unable to pull away because he had gearbox troubles. On lap 31 — still intending to run non-stop — Alesi's engine blew up and Senna was back in the lead. Patrese tried to pass Piquet but went wide and de Cesaris was able to take third.

He then passed Piquet to take second, with Patrese following him through soon after. Piquet began to drop back and Berger passed him. Patrese had gearbox troubles and was suddenly behind Berger and Piquet. On lap 41, de Cesaris, around 2 seconds behind Senna retired when his engine expired. Moreno passed the struggling Patrese on the next lap. Senna won with Berger making it a McLaren 1–2 ahead of Piquet, Moreno, Patrese and Mark Blundell.

Race 12: Italy

There was controversy before the Italian Grand Prix at the Monza Autodrome near Milan as Schumacher signed a deal with Benetton which displeased Jordan who went to court. The court decided in favour of Benetton with Schumacher and Moreno swapping teams. Bernie Ecclestone assisted both teams by supplying payments to Moreno and the Jordan team.
In qualifying, Senna took pole ahead of Mansell, Berger, Patrese, Prost and Alesi. At the start, Alesi steamed by Prost and hit Patrese into the first chicane and had to pit for repairs. Senna led Mansell, Berger, Patrese, Prost and Schumacher at the end of the first lap.

Patrese began to charge, passing Berger on lap 7. As Mansell was having difficulty finding a way around Senna, he put out his hand and waved Patrese ahead of him. He then attacked Senna and took the lead on lap 26. However, on the next lap, Patrese spun and he could not select full gears then. He went to the pits and retired. At the same time, Prost passed Berger to take third. Mansell now began to hound Senna and went all directions to get ahead.

He finally did it on lap 34 and Senna came into the pits for tyres. When he rejoined, the order was Mansell, Prost, Berger, Schumacher, Senna and de Cesaris. Senna was on a charge, passing Schumacher immediately after his stop. Berger then waved him through to see if he could attack Prost. Behind them, on lap 45, Piquet passed de Cesaris for sixth. Senna got ahead of Prost on the second chicane with seven laps remaining. Mansell won from Senna, Prost, Berger, Schumacher and Piquet.

With four races remaining, Senna held an 18-point lead over Mansell in the Drivers' Championship, 77 to 59. Patrese was third with 34, followed by Berger with 31, and Prost with 25. In the Constructors' Championship, McLaren led Williams by 15 points, 108 to 93, with Ferrari a distant third with 39.

Race 13: Portugal

The Estoril circuit near Lisbon hosted the Portuguese round, and Patrese took pole ahead of Berger, Senna, Mansell, Prost and Alesi. At the start, Mansell sliced across in front of Senna and switched sides to sneak by Berger. The order at the end of lap 1 was: Patrese, Mansell, Berger, Senna, Alesi and Prost.

The Williamses pulled away from the McLarens who were pulling away from the Ferraris (Prost had by now passed Alesi). On lap 18, Patrese waved Mansell through and decided to follow him. The McLarens stopped first and Senna got ahead of Berger. When Mansell stopped on lap 29, his crew had trouble fixing the wheelnut of his right rear properly. As the Williams mechanic went to get a spare nut, the lollipop man, unaware of the trouble signalled for Mansell to depart. Immediately, his right rear fell off and he stopped in the middle of the pitlane. The team retrieved the tyre, fixed it on Mansell's car and sent him on his way but he had dropped to 17th.

At the front, Berger passed Senna and set off after Patrese only for his engine to fail on lap 38. Two laps later, Prost from third went out with the same problem. This put the order as: Patrese, Senna, Alesi, Martini, Capelli and Piquet. On lap 49, Mansell who had charged through the field took sixth from his former arch-rival Piquet and was only 15 seconds from third place. Then, on lap 51, he was shown the black disqualification flag for the pit-lane infringement. Capelli spun off on lap 65 from fifth. Patrese won from Senna, Alesi, Martini, Piquet and Schumacher.

Race 14: Spain

The Spanish Grand Prix had moved from the Jerez circuit near Seville to the brand-new Catalunya circuit in Montmeló, on the other side of Spain. Berger took pole in Spain ahead of Mansell, Senna, Patrese, Schumacher and Prost. At the start, it was damp and Senna blasted past Mansell while Patrese messed up again, dropping to sixth. Midway through the lap, Schumacher passed Mansell to take third. The order was: Berger, Senna, Schumacher, Mansell, Prost and Patrese.

Mansell repassed Schumacher near the end of the second lap and set off after Senna. On lap 5, Mansell and Senna went side by side down the main straight but Mansell was ahead as he had the inside line. As the track dried, everyone stopped and Berger's stop was slow. Senna's stop was quick and he took the lead ahead of Berger, Mansell, Prost, Schumacher and Patrese. Senna then let Berger through on lap 12 in order to hold up Mansell while Schumacher overtook Prost at the same time. Then, Senna spun into the last corner and dropped behind Mansell, Schumacher and Prost.

Mansell quickly reeled in Berger and got ahead on lap 20 and proceeded to pull away. Schumacher now came to attack Berger and when he tried, he messed up and spun off. He rejoined back down in sixth. On lap 33, Berger slowed down with electrical troubles and retired. Soon afterwards, Patrese passed Senna for third. Schumacher had blistered his tyres in the spin and pitted, dropping behind Alesi who charged forward and passed Senna. Mansell crucially won from Prost, Patrese, Alesi, Senna and Schumacher.

With two races to go, Senna led Mansell by 16 points in the Drivers' Championship, 85 to 69, with only a maximum of 20 points still available. Patrese was third with 48, while Prost and Berger both had 31. The Constructors' Championship was much closer with Williams leading McLaren by one point, 117 to 116, while Ferrari was third with 52.

Race 15: Japan

At the challenging Suzuka circuit in Japan, the McLarens took 1–2 in qualifying with Berger ahead of Senna, Mansell, Prost, Patrese and Alesi. At the start, Berger got away well and Senna blocked Mansell while behind them Patrese got by Prost. Alesi did not last long, his engine failing even before finishing the lap. The order was: Berger, Senna, Mansell, Patrese, Prost and Martini.

Senna let Berger pull away and then held up Mansell, who had to win to keep his World Championship hopes alive. Mansell was frustrated at seeing Berger pull away and hounded Senna in the hope that Senna would make a mistake. However, it was Mansell who made a mistake first, spinning off in a cloud of smoke at the start of lap 10 as he was having brake problems. He was out and Senna was World Champion for the third time.

The McLaren team told Berger to let Senna through and thus protect him with the promise that Senna will let him back ahead on the last lap if they stay 1–2.  There were no changes after the stops and the order stayed as: Senna, Berger, Patrese, Prost, Martini and Schumacher. At the front, Senna and Berger traded fastest laps. On lap 29, well behind Schumacher passed Martini for fifth. Nakajima in the second Tyrrell spun off at the S Curves and hit the tyre barrier in the gravel trap by lap 31 (Nakajima was unhurt). However, Schumacher's engine failed on lap 35, giving the place back to Martini. Martini only held it for five more laps before his clutch failed, forcing him to retire.

Nothing then changed afterwards, and Senna kept McLaren's agreement with Berger, by letting Berger through to win on the last lap. Berger won ahead of the new world champion Senna, Patrese, Prost, Martin Brundle and Modena. The McLaren Honda 1–2 also meant that they were now 11 points ahead of Williams Renault and had a grip on the Constructors' Championship.

Race 16: Australia

Before the final race at the street circuit in Adelaide, Australia, Prost was fired from the Ferrari team because he made some scathing comments about the team and described his car as a 'truck' when his shock absorbers failed, and the Ferrari team as unwilling to work with him during a press conference for the Japanese Grand Prix. He was replaced by Ferrari test driver Gianni Morbidelli (who had been driving for Minardi). Although the Drivers' Championship had already been decided, the Constructors' Championship had not – this was still being disputed by the McLaren and Williams teams.

In qualifying, McLaren took 1–2 ahead of the Williamses and the Benettons with Senna ahead of Berger, Mansell, Patrese, Piquet, and Schumacher. At the start, in extremely torrential wet conditions, Patrese lost time and was quickly behind Piquet and Alesi had also got by him and Schumacher. Senna led from Berger, Mansell, Piquet, Alesi and Patrese. On lap 3, Berger went wide allowing Mansell to be second and thus go after Senna. He was close enough on lap 5 and was side by side with Senna on the next lap but saw yellow flags because of Nicola Larini's crash. Thus he was forced to back off and Senna retained the lead. Alesi spun off immediately and was followed there by Schumacher. Both were out.

Then, on lap 8, Pierluigi Martini spun off into the wall and his front wing, which separated from his car, was hit by Patrese and got stuck in Patrese's undertray. At the front, Mansell was no longer attacking Senna but Senna was unable to pull away. The conditions became better but after another seven laps, the weather started to become worse and more drivers began to spin off, including Mansell who smashed into a wall- which allowed McLaren to win the Constructors' Championship. Berger also spun off twice on the next lap as Senna gestured to the marshals to try to get the race stopped. Patrese followed suit and finally it was stopped after Senna had finished lap 16. However, the officials had decided to count the results back 2 laps to lap 14 which meant that Senna won from Mansell, Berger, Piquet, Patrese and Morbidelli. Only half points were awarded because the race was stopped before 75% of the distance was over. This particular Grand Prix set a record as the shortest Grand Prix ever run until the 2021 Belgian Grand Prix at Spa which only lasted 3 laps, all behind the safety car on 29 August 2021.

Because only half points were awarded in Australia, at the end of the season, Senna was the world champion with 96 points with Mansell second with 72, Patrese third with 53, Berger fourth with 43, Prost fifth with 34, Piquet sixth with 26.5, Alesi seventh with 21 and Modena eighth with 10. In the Constructors' Championship, McLaren-Honda was the World Champion with 139 points, with Williams-Renault second with 125, Ferrari third with 55.5, and Benetton-Ford fourth with 38.5.

The 1991 season was to be the last in which Ayrton Senna, Alain Prost, Nigel Mansell and Nelson Piquet competed together, the four drivers having between them won 93 of the 112 Grands Prix since 1985 and all seven Drivers' Championships during this period. Piquet retired from F1 at season's end, while Prost decided to take a sabbatical in 1992. Mansell would win the Drivers' Championship in 1992 and then leave F1 for CART; Prost would win the championship in 1993 and then retire; and Senna would lose his life at the 1994 San Marino Grand Prix.

Results and standings

Grands Prix

Points scoring system

Points were awarded to the top six finishers in each race as follows:

World Drivers' Championship standings

Notes:
 – Driver did not finish the Grand Prix but was classified, as he completed more than 90% of the race distance.

World Constructors' Championship standings

Notes:
 – Driver did not finish the Grand Prix but was classified, as he completed more than 90% of the race distance.

Non-championship event results
The 1991 season also included a single event which did not count towards the World Championship, the Formula One Indoor Trophy at the Bologna Motor Show.

References

Formula One seasons